Ishtiburi is a rural locality (a selo) and the administrative center of Ishtiburinsky Selsoviet, Untsukulsky District, Republic of Dagestan, Russia. The population was 291 as of 2010.

Geography 
Ishtiburi is located 35 km west of Shamilkala (the district's administrative centre) by road. Kolob is the nearest rural locality.

References 

Rural localities in Untsukulsky District